Tova O'Brien (born ) is a New Zealand political journalist. She hosts the Tova breakfast show on New Zealand news and talk radio station Today FM, and previously led the team of political reporters for Newshub.

Early life and education 
O’Brien was born in Papua New Guinea. Her mother, a British journalist, and her father, a New Zealand helicopter pilot, had met while working in the country. When O'Brien was six months old, the family moved to New Zealand. Her parents separated when she was three and O'Brien was raised by her mother in Wellington.

After high school, she started a degree at the University of Otago in film and psychology. She did not complete the degree, instead going overseas to work in Melbourne and London in hospitality. In 2006 she decided to train as a journalist and completed a qualification at Massey University. Her first journalism role after graduating was at Radio Active in Wellington.

Career 
O'Brien was a reporter in the parliamentary press gallery in Wellington before joining MediaWorks New Zealand in 2007.

In 2016 she was assigned the role of European correspondent for Newshub (MediaWorks' news division). In 2018 she returned to Wellington and became Newshub's political editor, succeeding Patrick Gower. Her style of journalism, according to Gower, is "edgy", and she attracts a lot of criticism due to her high profile.

In October 2020, O'Brien's interview with Jami-Lee Ross, co-leader of the Advance New Zealand party, garnered 7 million views. She was internationally praised by journalists for preventing Ross from mentioning conspiracy theories about the COVID-19 pandemic during the interview.

In November 2021, Mediaworks, O’Brien’s former workplace, rehired her to host the breakfast radio show on new talk station Today FM, which launched on 21 March 2022. She left Discovery and her Political Editor position at Newshub prior to starting with MediaWorks.

Recognition 
In 2019, O'Brien won the award for Political Journalist of the Year at the Voyager Media Awards. The citation read:

Personal life 
O'Brien married Nathan "Nato" Hickey in 2016 in London; they had known each other since 2006 from Wellington. Hickey is a drummer for the Wellington heavy metal band Beastwars.

References

External links

1980s births
Living people
New Zealand television journalists
New Zealand women television journalists
People from Wellington City
Massey University alumni
Date of birth missing (living people)